Keith Joseph Loneker (June 21, 1971June 22, 2017) was an American actor and American football player. For much of his short career, his large football-lineman build garnered him roles largely as thugs or football players. His first movie was director Steven Soderbergh's Out of Sight (1998) and later the Neil LaBute thriller, Lakeview Terrace (2008).

Biography 

Growing up in Roselle Park, New Jersey, Loneker faced some personal obstacles that he worked hard to overcome for his entire life. In high school, while playing football, he endured a hip injury, for which doctors said he would never play any sports again. Loneker ignored the doctor and decided to work out intensely to rehabilitate himself.  After two years being off, he stepped onto a football field once again.  Loneker, although just happy to play again with his friends, ended up with a scholarship to the University of Kansas.

NFL career 

Although Loneker was passed over in the NFL draft after graduation, he insisted on "walking on" with the Los Angeles Rams.  Loneker not only made the team but went on to start by the end of his first season. Loneker blocked for then rookie running back, Jerome Bettis.

Acting career 
While playing in the NFL, a former teammate who was working as an agent called Loneker and told him he had a part for which he thought he'd be perfect.  Loneker had never acted before, but made a tape for the audition and the producers hired him from his tape alone.  He was surprised when he landed the role of "White Boy Bob" in Out of Sight.  Loneker went on to roles in Rock Star, Superbad, Leatherheads, and Lakeview Terrace.  When Loneker wasn’t auditioning for movie roles, he was a substitute teacher at Lawrence High School in Lawrence, Kansas.

Personal life and death
Loneker died of cancer on June 22, 2017. He had a daughter Kylee Loneker, and a son, Keith Loneker, Jr., who also played football at the University of Kansas.

Filmography
*Also starred in “Destination: Planet Negro” (2013). Role: Monster Truck Rally.

References

External links 
 

1971 births
2017 deaths
American male film actors
American male television actors
Atlanta Falcons players
Los Angeles Rams players
People from Roselle Park, New Jersey
St. Louis Rams players
20th-century American male actors
21st-century American male actors
Deaths from cancer in Kansas